Military law literature in India was established in 1930 by General C.H. Harrington out of a perceived necessity in order to avoid potential injustice within and outside of the armed forces. Military law is a body of law which governs how a member of the armed forces may behave, and as with all forms of law it is subject to periodic changes. The field is based upon official Acts of the Indian government, plus a number of unofficial writings on theoretical applications of law and how it may be changed.

General 
Military law provisions govern the role of the Indian Army during peace and war formulated in the form of Statutes, Rules and Regulations.  It is a written code which has seen periodic changes and review, apart from conventions (customs) of service.

Official publications mainly take the form of the Army Act, 1950; Army Rules 1954; and Regulations for the Army, 1987 (in short RA). The 1958 Armed Forces (Special Powers) Act and the Armed Forces Tribunal Act, 2007, and are also relevant legislation.  Another significant but obscure provision is Notes to Indian Military and Air Force Law, commonly referred as NMAFL. For reasons not known, RA and NMAFL continue to be inaccessible to scholars and the public.

There are two aspects significant for the purpose of this discussion.  Firstly, military law publications were called by different names in the earlier years.  However, these were all official publications.  Law being complex and technical in nature, these text were not easy to comprehend and apply.  The same called for a need to draft ‘notes’ or ‘comments’ thereto.  These were prepared and duly inserted by the authorities, whose identity was not indicated.  Secondly, military law was included in the syllabus for retention and promotion examinations for military officers.  This was done with a view to make the officers study and assimilate relevant legal provisions necessary for enforcement of a disciplinary code amongst the men under their command. A need therefore, existed for publication of books that could explain, guide and amplify the rules.  Thus such handbooks were required not only for application of law  by the officers for unit routine but also for their understanding while preparing for obligatory examinations.

Infrequent actions were also taken to bring out precise and other publications at command and corps level for dissemination of military law.  These too were all in-house publications.

Early works 
The growth of Indian military law literature emerged from sheer necessity.  This need was acknowledged by General C.H. Harrington GBE, KCB, DSO, DCL, the then General Officer Commanding in Chief of Quetta-based Western Command on 28 October 1930 in a foreword to the book titled Handbook of Military Law by Capt. R.J. Wilkins and W.S. Chaney.  He wrote,

Military and Cantonment Law in India, published in 1904, is perhaps the oldest publication still available on military law.  The author in his preface clarified the object of his work was to supply what is believed to be a want by supplementing for India the Manual of Military Law, first published by the War Office in England in 1899.

Between the Two Wars 
Court Martials in India was authored by Major LM Peet, officiating Assistant Judge Advocate General, Eastern Command. The publication carries valuable inputs for the conduct of courts martial. It would amaze one to find that common mistakes listed in the book are still often repeated today.

Indian Military Law by Lt. Col. ST Banning, CBE was printed in Great Britain.  It was published “on the urgent request of several officers of the Indian Army who had studied the subject with (the author) while preparing for their examinations.”  Another book by Banning, Military Law, had by then already run into 18th edition.  Yet another notable work by the author was titled Military Law Made Easy.

Notes on Military Law (published 1935, reprinted 1942) was issued by General Headquarters, India. It carried a preface by General AB Haig, Adjutant General in India.

Post Independence 
Handbook of Military Law by C. Sanjeevarow Nayudu was perhaps the first book post independence on military law.  The author had declared in the preface that he was induced to write the book driven by the extreme need and usefulness of a military handbook.  The foreword was written by Mr. B.R. Ambedkar, at the time Minister for Law, Government of India.  Ambedkar admitted that “for some reason Military Law has not attracted the attention of students of Indian Law and there are very few books on the subject”.

Capt. K.K. Pradhan came out with Text Book of Military Law in 1956.  The book's nine chapters dealt with military law enforcement provisions, evidence, duties in aid of the civil power and lastly National Cadet Corps Act and Rules.

Privileges of the Military Personnel in Courts of Law was written with a very concise aim.  It was a very detailed and exhaustive treatment of the topic, from a seasoned District & Sessions Judge.  A notable feature of the book was its coverage of the provisions concerning defence of mechanical transport drivers in claims for damages arising out of accidents.  Perhaps a book of this nature duly updated is needed even now.

‘Guide to Courts Martial’ by B.L. Goswami was a concise work directed solely at the procedures to applicable at the trial stage.  Another book by the same author dealt with the topic of courts of inquiry.

SC Consul, Advocate, came up with his book Law Relating to Military Service, Conditions, Privileges and Restrictions in 1965.  A number of its chapters related to matters like conditions of service; penal deductions; service privileges; The Indian Soldiers (Litigation) Act, 1925; choice between criminal court and court martial; and restrictions on fundamental rights.

The next book worthy of note and written by a military lawyer was Military Law in India, first published in 1973.  The author, Rear Admiral OP Sharma, disclosed that the text was the doctoral dissertation for the degree of Doctor of Philosophy in Law to the Bombay University.  It was an exposition of the principles and procedures of military law as they had developed over the last few centuries.  The foreword to the book was written by Justice PB Gajendera Gadkar, a former Vice Chancellor of the Bombay University and formerly the Chief Justice of India. Sharma's effort is to be specially commended because it pointed out the shortcomings and the gaps in the Indian Military Law.  It indicated the ways in which it could be reformed so as to be in line with the role of a soldier in a democratic socialist set up.  The work had taken into account more than 200 judgments of Indian High Courts and the Supreme Court.  The publication was a scholarly work of merit and made a definite contribution to the knowledge of the law relating to the armed forces.

Exploration: 1980s and 1990s 

1981's Military Law at a Glance was a concise book that came in the form of a handbook for army promotion examinations.  The author claimed that the publication should serve as a help book to find the solution of confronting problems without going into the voluminous source material.

Regimental Officer's Handbook on Military Law (Questions & Answers) was an invaluable book authored by Brig. AC Mangala.  The book, running into 160 pages, was printed by Army Printing Press at Lucknow in November 1984.  This was a revised edition of the same title first brought out in January 1976.  The author in his preface had pointed out that the object of the book was to make readily available to regimental officer's answers to such practical problems which they have to tackle during the course of their duties in the units and on the staff.  Lt. Gen. R.D. Hira, Adjutant General in his foreword to the first edition had hoped that the publication would be useful to officers preparing for promotion and DSSC entrance examination.

Military Law in India was a joint effort by Dr. D.C. Jain, Dr. N.K. Indrayan and Maj. C.G. Goel.  The work was in the form of a section wise narration of the Army Act provisions with a commentary for each clause.  A significant feature of the book was incorporation of relevant case law.

The main utility of Study and Practice of Military Law by Col. G.K. Sharma, first published in 1988, was for assisting regimental officers in dealing with disciplinary cases.  The author claimed that his work was a means to find ready answers to the day to day legal problems, faced by commanders, staff officers and persons interested in the study and practice of military law.

The higher judiciary of law need to consult compilation of case laws on some or similar legal issues.  Need for such a compilation was long felt by judges, lawyers and military authorities.  First published in 1989, Relating to the Armed Forces in India was the first and only book covering rulings given by Supreme Court and various High Courts on military law and service conditions of the armed forces as well as civilians paid from the defence estimates and ex-servicemen. All the important judgments, reported or unreported were classified under main headings and sub headings and were listed subject wise in a chronological order. Field Marshal SHFJ Manekshaw in his foreword to the book wrote, “I am sure that their (authors) efforts would be of immense use not only to those in the legal profession but to the staff officers in the Army units and formations as we.”  The book has since come out in five editions with substantial increase in its contents.
 
A publication titled Compendium of Law for Defence Services came in 1991.  It was essentially a reproduction of Manual of Military Law.  However, merit of special note were to portions running into four pages that covered a brief appraisal of trial by courts martial and drawbacks in the system of trials by courts martial.

Major L.J. Obheroi's book Questions Answered on Military Law was released in May 1994.  The author in the preface declared the main objective to present a useful and accurate guide to commanding officers, formation commanders and staff and regimental officers in regard to their powers and functions under the Army Act, 1950.  Obheroi claimed that this was the only book which explains how to refer to MML and RA in order to extract the correct answers, with practical examples.  The book was divided in 20 chapters including specimen charges.

A significant step with regard to military law publications is the Military Law Journal.  First started in 1996 as a news letter of the Judge Advocate General's Department, it later took the shape of a reproduction of case law concerning military law.  It is now a bi-annual journal brought out by the Institute of Military Law, in Kamptee, Nagpur, as a priced publication bearing ISIN no. ISIN-0971-7803.  It is divided in two parts.  While the first contains articles and book reviews, the second part carries decisions of the high Courts, Supreme Court, High Courts in India and different benches of the Armed Forces Tribunal on different aspects concerning the Army.  Yet another notable feature is its historical section in which earlier cases of relevance are reproduced.  With its maiden appearance in 1996, the Military Law Journal carries complete text of relevant judgments of the Supreme Court.  It also carries review of new books.

Court Martial and Military Matters by Brig. (now Maj. Gen.) Nilendra Kumar was an attempt to discuss the complexities of modern legal thought as pertaining to military canvas.  It took into account a thorough overview of military law.  It did not merely described the law but pointed the way ahead.  The book in its 15 articles did not present merely abstract legal theory but a discussion of legal principles as well as ground realities.  It took stock of practical infirmities in the law.

The History of the Department of Judge Advocate General was an attempt at the official narration of JAG's Department history.  The text traced the origin of the department and system of courts martial in India.  Suitably divided in 10 chapters, the text dealt with pre- and post-independent eras, revision of publications, legal cells, origin of Corps Day and Institute of Military Law.  It also carried a list of the officers serving in the department at the time of publication.  The book came in time with the first reunion of the JAG's Department.

Maturation: 2000s 

Military Law Handbook for Commanders was published in 2001 with a firm belief of the author that sound administration and personnel management calls for due emphasis on fair play, adherence to laid down norms and humane treatment of the subordinates. The work was indeed of practical help to commanders at various levels. The second edition of the book in 2011 took into account new changes like setting up of the Armed Forces Tribunal, the Right to Information Act and adoption of information technology by the armed forces.

Pension Regulations for the Army 1961 (including 1940) was the title chosen by Captain R.S. Dhull for his first book, in 2005–2006.  The effort made pension regulations available to the courts, lawyers and litigants that were otherwise almost never to be found.

2007-2008 Armed Forces by Captain R.S. Dhull was a self-published compilation of decisions of higher judiciary in India.  It also carried up-to-date orders and information relating to pension.  It took into account 20 judgments of the Supreme Court and 47 of various High Courts.

Soldiers invalided out from service on medical grounds are entitled to the award of disability pension when the disability recorded is found to be attributable to or aggravated by the service conditions. Law Relating to the Disability Benefits in the Armed Forces was a 2002 compilation of case law where the higher judiciary had examined the legality of executive decisions taken in the matter of awarding disability pensions.  It also discussed various dimensions of the provisions relating to award of disability benefits to uniformed service members.

Case Studies on Military Law by Maj. Gen. Nilendra Kumar was first published in 2003. It presented live cases relating to investigations and enquiries, disciplinary and administrative action decisions starting with hearing of charge and leading on to disposal of cases.  The identity of the offenders, witnesses and those who dealt with the matter as well as units and formations had been concealed. The case studies compiled in the book were intended to help commanders by drawing suitable lessons by way of an opportunity to carry out a critical analysis of actual situations.  A review of the book in USI Journal hailed it as a “valuable contribution for proper understanding of the subject through live case studies.”

Courts Martial Under Scrutiny by Maj. Gen Nilendra Kumar appeared as a discourse on divergent issues concerning operations, procurements litigation, human resource management, low intensity conflicts, international terrorism and peace enforcement operations.  It was an exercise to analyse critical areas showing crucial deficiencies in the existing legal procedures as noted from academic scrutiny and actual application.

Military Law and Writs was brought out by Major J.L. Obheroi in 2003 as author and publisher.  The voluminous work – spread over 30 chapters – was meant to assist the practitioners of military law by providing them with a ready reckoner to deal with writ petitions.  It also contained relevant case law.  It covered the whole spectrum of one's service conditions, rights, duties and obligations.

Military Law: Then, Now & Beyond was published by the Judge Advocate General's Department at the time of their second reunion in 2005. The work was conceived, designed and produced by Maj. Gen. Nilendra Kumar. This was a unique publication in the form of interviews, articles, poems and pictures.  The book was divided into portions dealing with reminiscences; izzat, honour and ethics; courts martial; litigation; law of war, gender justice and human rights, legal training, media and other issues, recollections from the past; Armed Forces Tribunal, reforms in military law; empowerment; and way ahead. The book carried interviews with General J. J. Singh, Chief of the Army Staff, and with Justice Brigadier DM Sen, the first Judge Advocate General of free India.  The contributors to the book were some of the well known experts on military and legal issues, including Lt. Gen. V. R. Raghavan, Justice DP Wadhwa formerly of the Supreme Court, Dr. Manoj Kumar Sinha, Dr. Manish Arora, Dr. Shyamlha Pappu, Maj. Gen. V. K. Singh, SV Thapliyal, AB Gorthi, Maria Teresa Dutli, Krister Thelin, KPD Samanta, Diane Guillemette, Dr. N.M. Ghatate, and Pravin H. Parekh.

Military Law Lexicon was a joint effort by Maj. Gen. Nilendra Kumar and Kush Chaturvedi.  It was a compendium of military legal terms, a necessary step for understanding military terms.  Various terms were explained by a combination of means: sometimes by their dictionary meaning, sometimes by statutory definition, and at places by a combination of both.  Terms of foreign usage were also included.

The Military Justice System in India: An Analysis by Wg. Cdr. U.C. Jha was a critical study of existing military justice system in India and its comparison with that of the UK and the USA.  It enumerated the deficiencies in the Indian military justice system.  It articulated that limitations on human rights must be provided for by law and should be consistent with international treaty obligations.  The author strongly called for drafting a common code for the three services.  He was also in favour of the judicial branch of the armed forces to be headed by a Chief Judge Advocate General, of the rank of Lieutenant General, under the Ministry of Defence.

Courts on Military Law, by Col. G.K. Sharma and Col. M.S. Jaswal, was first published in 2006 and then revised and enlarged in 2010. It is a narration of the Army Act and Army Rule provisions.  Each section or rule was followed by a commentary which was essentially a case law relevant to the text thereof.  The book drew upon 954 decided cases to build up its text, including rulings on pension matters.

Wg. Cdr. U.C. Jha came out with a work titled Armed Forces Tribunal in 2010.  The book critically examined the jurisdiction and powers of the Armed Forces Tribunal.  It gave an insight into the problems that were likely to be encountered by the Tribunal when it started functioning.  It also carried a resume of the existing system of grievances redressal.

The other book by Wg. Cdr. U.C. Jha in 2010 was titled The South Asian Military Law Systems,  It was a comparative study of the military law systems of the five South Asian countries: Bangladesh, India, Nepal, Pakistan and Sri Lanka.  It also included certain portions on Law of Armed Conflict and International Human Rights Law, relevant to the activities of the Armed Forces.  The author devoted a separate chapter to conclusions and recommendations.  He advocated separation of the Judge Advocate branches of the respective services and their placement under the Ministry of Law and Justice.

A Handbook of Military Law by Wg. Cdr. Dr. U.C. Jha was claimed by the author to have been written with an aim to serve as a ready reference for the officers of the Indian Army who would like to know something about their legal rights and responsibilities.  The handbook also covered the syllabus of Part B and D promotion examinations and DSSC entrance examination.  The portion on "Right to Information" had information on a matter otherwise little known to the military.  The last chapter dealt with military contingents in peacekeeping.

Court Martial Process: Empirically studied was the work of Brigadier Rama Gopal Vidhu.  This 2011 work was based on the award of Ph.D by the University of Delhi.  The text drew heavily on the responses of 200 military and civilian personnel to undertake a comprehensive analysis of the court martial process.  The book carried a number of useful suggestions to streamline the procedures at different stages of courts martial.

See also 
 Court-martial
 Military justice
 United Service Institution of India

References 
The above text is based chiefly on an article by Major General Nilendra Kumar, former Judge Advocate General, Indian Army.

Military of India
Military law
Law of India
Legal literature